Cicer reticulatum is a species of flowering plant in the family Fabaceae, native to southeastern Turkey. It is the wild ancestor of Cicer arietinum, the chickpea or garbanzo. It appears that Cicer reticulatum had already developed the tan-seeded kabuli and the smaller green-seeded desi types prior to the domestication of the chickpea at the dawn of agriculture.

References

Faboideae
Endemic flora of Turkey
Plants described in 1975